Fredrik Jensen may refer to:

 Fredrik Jensen (soldier) (1921–2011), Norwegian soldier
 Fredrik Jensen (footballer, born 1985), Swedish footballer
 Fredrik Oldrup Jensen (born 1993), Norwegian footballer
 Fredrik Jensen (footballer, born 1997), Finnish footballer